EAL may refer to:

Education 
 Deutsche Schule Lissabon, a German school in Lisbon, Portugal

Science 
 EAL domain, a conserved protein domain
 Ethanolamine ammonia-lyase
 Echelle Atomique Libre (Free Atomic Scale), a time scale underlying International Atomic Time

Transportation 
 Ealing Broadway station, in Greater London
 Eastern Air Lines, a defunct American airline in operation 1926 to 1991
 Eastern Air Lines (2015), a defunct American charter airline in operation 2011 to 2017
 Eastern Airlines, LLC, an American airline
 Emergency Autoland, an aircraft rescue system for an incapacitated pilot
 Ethiopian Airlines
 Emirates Air Line, former name of the London Cable Car
 East Rail line, in Hong Kong

Other uses 
 English as an additional language
 Evaluation Assurance Level
 Elephant Action League, an American conservation organisation
 Estonian Actuarial Society

See also 
 Eel (disambiguation)